Yang Fan may refer to:

 Yonfan (born 1947), Taiwanese film director and photographer
 Yang Fan (speed skater), Chinese speed skater
 Yang Fan (weightlifter), Chinese weightlifter
 Yang Fan (footballer, born 16 January 1995), Chinese footballer
 Yang Fan (footballer, born 24 January 1995), Chinese footballer
 Yang Fan (footballer, born 1996), Chinese footballer
 Fan Yang (artist) (born 1962), Canadian bubble artist
 Fan Yang (cyclist) (born 1990), Chinese track cyclist
 Fan Yang (pool player), Pool player